Mong Yawng is a town, located in eastern Shan State, Myanmar.

History

Mongyawng State (Möngyawng) was one of the Shan States. It was annexed by Kengtung State in 1815. Mong Yawng was the capital of the State.

References

Township capitals of Myanmar
Populated places in Shan State